3-Fumarylpyruvate hydrolase (nagK (gene), naaD (gene)) is an enzyme with systematic name 3-fumarylpyruvate hydrolyase. This enzyme catalyses the following chemical reaction

 3-fumarylpyruvate + H2O  fumarate + pyruvate

The enzyme is involved in bacterial degradation of 5-substituted salicylates.

References

External links 
 

EC 3.7.1